Robert Johnson (1540 – 1625) was a Church of England cleric and the founder of both Oakham School and Uppingham School.

He was a Puritan rector of North Luffenham, Rutland, for 51 years, from 1574 until his death. He was also a Canon of Windsor (1572 to 1625) and Archdeacon of Leicester (1591 to 1625), and using the income from these and other church posts he held concurrently, he founded free grammar schools in Oakham and Uppingham in 1584, as well as other charitable institutions.  He enjoyed the patronage of William Cecil, 1st Baron Burghley.

Family

He was born in Stamford to Maurice and Jane Johnson, one of seven children; his father was Member of Parliament for Stamford.  He married three times and had a son, Abraham, by his third wife, Maria (née Hird); through his son he had thirteen grandchildren.  His grandson, Isaac Johnson used his large inheritance from Archdeacon Robert to fund the Massachusetts Bay Colony expedition of 1630, and was the man who named the place they settled "Boston".  Three other grandsons John Johnson, Thomas Johnson, and Robert Johnson were among the founders of New Haven, Connecticut.   Robert Johnson's great grandson Samuel Johnson founded King's College, now Columbia University.

Robert Johnson died on 23 July 1625 in North Luffenham and his memorial is in the chancel of the parish church there.

Charitable works

His puritan beliefs meant he placed great importance on education, and he set up the grammar schools in the two towns of Rutland so that those who were too poor to pay for schooling could be taught Hebrew, Greek and Latin.

Among other endowments and foundations, Archdeacon Johnson founded Hospitals of Christ in Oakham and Uppingham, and re-founded and endowed the old hospital of Saint John the Evangelist and Saint Anne in Oakham.  The schools and hospitals received their charter from Queen Elizabeth I in 1587. He was also one of the eight founding fellows of Jesus College, Oxford.

A statue of Johnson can be seen on the Victoria Tower of Uppingham School.

References

External links
 History of Oakham School and Archdeacon Johnson

1540 births
1625 deaths
People from North Luffenham
16th-century English Puritan ministers
17th-century English Anglican priests
Canons of Windsor
Archdeacons of Leicester
English philanthropists
Fellows of Jesus College, Oxford